Post-amendment to the Tamil Nadu Entertainments Tax Act 1939 on 1 April 1958, Gross jumped to 140 per cent of Nett  Commercial Taxes Department disclosed 70 crore in entertainment tax revenue for the year.

A list of films produced in the Tamil film industry in India in 1990 by release date:

Released films 1990

References

1990
Tamil films
Lists of 1990 films by country or language
1990s Tamil-language films